Borago, or borage, is a genus of five species of herbs native to the Mediterranean, with one species, Borago officinalis, cultivated and naturalized throughout the world.

Uses
Borago officinalis is used medicinally, in companion planting, in cooking, and as an oilseed. Cooked stalks are sometimes eaten as a vegetable. The large, hairy leaves taste mildly of cucumber, and star-shaped purple-blue flowers are prized for their flavour. The leaves are often added to teas and salads, and the flowers have been added to wine (Borage has had a reputation to give one courage since Roman times). The flowers are highly attractive to bees. The hairs covering the plant are said to repel herbivores.

Description 
Borages are annual or perennial herbaceous plants with alternate leaves and long-stalked flowers. The inflorescences are branched scorpioid cymes, i.e. subsequent flowers are oriented in a curve, as in the tail of the scorpion.

The flowers are star-shaped wheel or bell-shaped; nectar is dispersed through a cone-shaped structure. They are pollinated by bees.
The corolla is blue, pink, or white. Corollas are rotate with five petals. The corolla tube is short or nonexistent. Throat scales are short, hairless, and emarginated, i.e. with a nick or notch at the apex, standing out from the crown.

The stamens are inserted near the base of the corolla. The anthers are mucronate, with long, pointed appendages, and are upright. The stamens protrude through the throat scales to nearly the bottom of the crown. The stamens are at the top of a long, narrow appendage. The appendix is a long, narrow apex. Styles are whole filiform to the base ovarium. The style does not extend beyond the scales of the throat and a capitate stigma. 

The fruits are small obovate achenes with a thick, ring-shaped collar at the base. Seeds are dispersed by ants.

Distribution
The species of this genus are found in cultivated and rocky areas through the southwestern Mediterranean. The genus is monophyletic and very close genetically to the sister genus Symphytum. Four of the five species are found only in northwest Africa, Corsica, Sardinia, and the Tuscan Archipelago. Only B. officinalis is widely cultivated, and has become naturalized through much of the temperate world (e.g. Argentina, Canada, Chile, United States, Mexico, and Paraguay). B. officinalis was once thought to be native to Syria, but it is probably of North African origin, where other Borago species occur.  It is often grown as ornamental.

Species
The genus comprises five species in two subgenera:

Subgenus Borago is characterized by erect herbaceous, wheel-shaped flowers, blue, sometimes white:
 Borago officinalis  cultivated throughout the world, native to North Africa
 Borago trabutii  endemic to the High Atlas and the Anti-Atlas, Morocco
 Borago longifolia  endemic to northern Algeria and Tunisia

Subgenus Buglossites is prostrate and has bright, bell-shaped flowers:
 Borago pygmaea  sometimes cultivated, native to Corsica, Sardinia, and the island of Capraia
 Borago morisiana  endemic to the island of San Pietro in southwestern Sardinia

References

Further reading
Bennett, M. (2003) Pulmonarias & the Borage Family. B.T. Batsford,

External links

Boraginoideae
Boraginaceae genera